Marquis de Vibraye is the title created by letters patent in 1625 and still held by the Hurault family. Their family seat is Château de Cheverny in the Loire Valley in France and Château de Semur-en-Vallon.

Title holders:
 Jacques Hurault, 1st Marquis de Vibraye
 Jacques Hurault, 2nd Marquis de Vibraye
 Henri-Emmanuel Hurault, 3rd Marquis de Vibraye
 Henri-Eléonorn Hurault, 4th Marquis de Vibraye
 Paul-Maximilien Hurault, 5th Marquis de Vibraye
 Louis Hurault, 6th Marquis de Vibraye
 Anne-Louis Victor Denis Hurault, 7th Marquis de Vibraye (1767–1843), politician and military officer
 Guillaume-Paul Louis Maximilien Hurault, 8th Marquis de Vibraye (1809–1878), amateur archaeologist
 ...
 Louis de Vibraye, the current Marquis de Vibraye

See also
 List of French marquisates

References

Vibraye
Vibraye